Jesse Blacker (born April 19, 1991) is a Canadian-Kazakh professional ice hockey defenceman. He is currently under contract with Avtomobilist Yekaterinburg of the Kontinental Hockey League (KHL). Blacker was drafted by the Toronto Maple Leafs in the second round (58th overall) of the 2009 NHL Entry Draft. He appeared in only one game in the National Hockey League (NHL), which was in 2014 for the Anaheim Ducks.

Playing career
Blacker started his junior career with the Windsor Spitfires in the OHL, winning the 2009 Memorial Cup. After finishing his junior season with Owen Sound in 2010, he was signed to a three-year entry level contract with Toronto Maple Leafs, and played professionally with the Toronto Marlies of the American Hockey League.

On November 16, 2013, he was traded to the Anaheim Ducks along with a conditional third-round draft pick and the Ducks original seventh-round pick (which was previously traded to Toronto) in the 2014 NHL Entry Draft in exchange for Peter Holland and Brad Staubitz.

In the 2014–15 season, on November 28, 2014, Blacker was recalled by the Ducks made his NHL debut against the Chicago Blackhawks. After one game with the Ducks, Blacker was traded to the Florida Panthers along with a conditional draft pick in exchange for Colby Robak on December 4, 2014.

In the off-season, Blacker was released to free agency by the Panthers after he failed to be tendered a qualifying offer. On July 7, 2015, unable to attain a NHL offer, Blacker signed a one-year AHL contract with the Texas Stars.

Following the 2015–16 campaign with the Stars, he opted to continue his career overseas, signing with the Nürnberg Ice Tigers of the German top-tier Deutsche Eishockey Liga (DEL) on April 28, 2016. After one year in Germany, Blacker headed to China, inking a deal with KHL side HC Kunlun Red Star in June 2017.
In his debut season in the KHL in 2017–18, Blacker registered 9 points in 49 games for the blueline.

Having concluded his contract with Kunlun, Blacker remained in the KHL signing as a free agent with Barys Astana on August 7, 2018.

Blacker played three productive seasons with Barys Nur-Sultan, gaining Kazakhstani citizenship during his tenure, before leaving the club as a free agent in securing a two-year contract in continue in the KHL with Avtmobilist Yekaterinburg on May 6, 2021.

Career statistics

Regular season and playoffs

International

See also
 List of players who played only one game in the NHL

References

No black eye for Blacker
Blacker goes home, demands trade from Spits
Tale of two Leaf hopefuls

External links
 

1991 births
Anaheim Ducks players
Avtomobilist Yekaterinburg players
Barys Nur-Sultan players
Canadian expatriate ice hockey players in China
Canadian expatriate ice hockey players in Germany
Canadian ice hockey defencemen
HC Kunlun Red Star players
Living people
Norfolk Admirals players
Owen Sound Attack players
San Antonio Rampage players
Ice hockey people from Toronto
Texas Stars players
Thomas Sabo Ice Tigers players
Toronto Maple Leafs draft picks
Toronto Marlies players
Windsor Spitfires players
Kazakhstani ice hockey defencemen
Naturalised citizens of Kazakhstan